Changi Airport MRT station is an underground Mass Rapid Transit (MRT) station serving Changi Airport and its supplementary structure Jewel in Changi, Singapore. It is the terminus of the Changi Airport branch of the East West line (EWL). The station is operated by SMRT Trains and is built in an east–west direction. The two ends of the station connects directly to Terminals 2 and 3 of Changi Airport.

While there were plans for a rail connection to the airport in the 1980s, plans were shelved due to the low viability of such a branch. With higher air traffic to Changi Airport and the proposal of a Terminal 3 in 1994, the rail link plan were revived. The current two-station branch line was finalised in 1996 and construction began in 1999.

The station opened on 8 February 2002, with passenger demand lower than expected. Nevertheless, it continues to provide an alternative transport option to the airport. Demand also improved when Terminal 3 opened in 2008. On 25 May 2019, it was announced that the station will be incorporated as part of the Thomson–East Coast line (TEL) as it extends to the airport's  Terminal 5 by 2040.

History

Early plans
A branch to the airport was included in the early plans of the MRT network in May 1982. The branch was to be built when the rest of the MRT system was completed. In 1983, the Mass Rapid Transit Corporation (MRTC) concluded through a feasibility study that there might not be sufficient passenger traffic to justify such a branch. As the MRT system was built below budget, plans for the connection were reviewed in 1984.

In 1985, the MRTC conducted a survey on transportation needs by airport workers in 1985, but concluded in January 1986 that the connection is unfeasible, with travellers preferring to commute to the airport by taxis. Communications Minister Yeo Ning Hong further explained that such an extension might be considered if there were development plans in the Changi area, otherwise the low demand might not meet operating costs. In 1991, he stated that such a connection would only be justified when 50 million passengers are using the airport annually, with projections that the airport would handle only about 34 million passengers annually at the beginning of the 20th century. The minister further stated that the airport was already well served by expressways with affordable taxi rates. Nevertheless, land needed for the possible route has already been reserved by the government.

Finalisation of rail connection
The proposal for the rail link to Changi Airport was revisited in August 1994, following a surge in airport usage that exceeded previous projections (10% compared to 6–7% annually). With plans for a new terminal to cater to the passenger growth, the Civil Aviation Authority of Singapore (CAAS) had urged the MRTC to reconsider the proposal for the rail link, as the new roads serving the new terminal might be insufficient. It was suggested for the new link to be built along with the new terminal. The airport link will branch off from the EWL at Tanah Merah station, although there were not yet plans for intermediate stops.

After another feasibility study by the Land Transport Authority (LTA) in March 1996, finalised plans for the  branch were announced by deputy prime minister Lee Hsien Loong on 15 November 1996. The branch, projected to be completed in 2001, will run from Tanah Merah station and have an intermediate stop at Somapah to serve the Changi Business Park and the exhibition centre. There were no plans to extend the branch towards the cargo and engineering complexes due to low demand in the area.

Construction and opening

The contract includes the construction of Changi Airport station and associated tunnels, a new baggage tunnel between Terminals 2 and 3 and a new vehicular underpass to serve Terminal 3. This project was a joint effort which combines Japanese technology and experience with local knowledge of subcontractor availability and supplier availability, due to the challenges of the construction of the station.

A groundbreaking ceremony was held on 29 January 1999. In the speech by then-communications minister Mah Bow Tan at the ceremony, he highlighted the challenges of the construction of the station, which would require close cooperation between various parties such as the Land Transport Authority (LTA), the CAAS and the contractors. For the construction of Changi Airport station, different methods of deep excavations using various ground support systems were adopted. The construction work involved the challenge of deep excavation works right next to nearby developments such as the existing Terminal 2 structures. In addition, close monitoring was needed for the construction of the  tunnel leading to the station, which passes directly underneath the runway and airport terminal. During the construction, CPG Consultants, which was designing Terminal 3 at the time, provided 20 staff to complement the LTA team on the Changi Airport line extension.

As part of the President's Challenge 2001, a part of a charity walk goes through the tunnel between Expo and Changi Airport stations.

The station opened on 8 February 2002, with the official opening ceremony of the Changi Airport MRT extension held on 27 February 2002. Since the station's opening, passenger traffic has been moderate, as most bus routes were maintained and continue to be a popular means of cheap, direct transport for local airport/airline employees, as well as travellers not living along the East West line. Many air travellers also prefer to continue taking taxis or private transport as not all of the MRT services have luggage racks in the trains. However, taxi drivers claimed that the station has put them at a disadvantage, reporting a loss of 20 percent in earnings, with about 20,500 commuters using the station daily as of March 2002.

Incorporation into the TEL
In July 2016, then Transport Minister Khaw Boon Wan announced the possibility of extending the Thomson–East Coast line (TEL) to Changi Airport, to provide a more direct connection from the airport to the city. The extension will open along with the future Terminal 5 of the airport. On 25 May 2019, the LTA further announced that the stretch between Tanah Merah and Changi Airport will be part of the Thomson–East Coast line (TEL) when it extends to Changi Airport from Sungei Bedok MRT station via Terminal 5 and will open in 2040.

Incidents
On 24 July 2002, a glass panel of the atria wall shattered. The area was quickly closed off for repairs but train services were not affected.
On 24 September 2003, a man died at the station, apparently having fallen five stories from the departure hall.
On 16 January 2020, rail operator SMRT reported a crack in the crossing at Changi Airport MRT Station during inspection works that morning. Trains had to be diverted to only one platform and travel at a slower speed as they approached the affected crossing. The fault was rectified and normal services resumed afterwards.

Station details

Services
Changi Airport station is served by the Changi Airport Branch of the EWL, which connects to the airport from Tanah Merah station as a shuttle service. The official station code is CG2, previously EW29. The next station towards Tanah Merah is Expo station. In 2040, the station will be served by the TEL when the line extends to the airport.

When the station first opened on 8 February 2002, the station was served by a through service from Boon Lay station to this station. However, due to low ridership, from 22 July 2003, this service reverted to a shuttle service, with trains from Changi Airport station terminating at Tanah Merah station instead. The first train from Changi Airport station departs at 5:31am on weekdays and Saturdays and 5:59am on Sundays instead, with the last train from the airport departing at 12:06am. From Tanah Merah station, the first train towards the station departs at 5:20am on weekdays and Saturdays and 5:47am on Sundays instead, with the last train towards the airport from Tanah Merah station departing at 11:50pm. Headways between trains varies from 7 to 13 minutes.

Design

Designed by architectural firm Skidmore, Owings and Merrill, various features have been incorporated into the station design to enhance the commuting experience of airport travellers. The station has wider faregates for commuters with luggage. These faregates, located on the same level as the station, also allow easier access for wheelchair users into the station. Changi Airport station is one of the first MRT stations to be wheelchair-accessible, with lifts and ramps retrofitted for barrier-free access. A tactile system, consisting of tiles with rounded or elongated raised studs, guides visually impaired commuters through the station.

At the two entrances of the station are glass atrium walls supporting an illuminated  linkbridge spanning over the island platform. The glass bridge allows unpaid transfer between the two terminals. Australian engineering company Meinhardt Facades provided structural design engineering of the glazing system and the tensioned cable structure of the atria's walls, with engineering input by Ove Arup and Partners.

The atria are designed to allow maximum sunlight into the station, with minimal structures used to maintain the transparency of the atria. The roof is only supported at its northern and southern ends, with a massive beam (the spine) running between the north and south. This beam is supported by a staggered structure made of reinforced concrete at one end and an ‘A’ frame column and stability truss at the other end. The facade panels are hung from vertical trusses at the end of each cantilever, with other cables (that runs diagonally and horizontally) supporting the panels.

The station design was awarded the 2004 American Architecture Award by the Chicago Athenaeum.
In 2011, the station was rated 10 out of 15 most beautiful subway stops in the world by BootsnAll.

References

External links

 
 Official SMRT blogsite
 HarbourFront to Changi Airport MRT station route

Railway stations in Singapore opened in 2002
Changi
Airport railway stations
Mass Rapid Transit (Singapore) stations
Skidmore, Owings & Merrill buildings